The Sanremo Music Festival 1987 was the 37th annual Sanremo Music Festival, held at the Teatro Ariston in Sanremo, province of Imperia, between 4 and 7 February 1987 and broadcast by Rai 1.

The show was presented by Pippo Baudo, while Carlo Massarini hosted  the segments from the Sanremo  PalaRock, where a number of foreign guests performed.

The winners of the Big Artists section were the trio consisting Gianni Morandi, Enrico Ruggeri and Umberto Tozzi with the song "Si può dare di più".

Michele Zarrillo won the "Newcomers" section with the song "La notte dei pensieri", and Fiorella Mannoia won the Critics Award with the song "Quello che le donne non dicono". 

During the final night an ashen faced Baudo came out to announce the death of four-time Sanremo winner Claudio Villa.

Participants and results

Big Artists

Newcomers

References 

Sanremo Music Festival by year
1987 in Italian music
1987 music festivals